Eupterote harmani is a moth in the family Eupterotidae. It was described by Jeremy Daniel Holloway in 1987. It is found on Borneo. The habitat consists of hill dipterocarp and upper montane forests.

References

Moths described in 1987
Eupterotinae